Amirkhan Alikovich Mori (born November 13, 1961, Tbilisi, Georgia) is a Georgian entrepreneur, Chairman of the Board at Regions Group. Mori is a Yazidi.

Biography
Amirkhan Mori graduated from the Moscow State University of Environmental Engineering with a degree in Economics and Management in 2003.

He did his military service in the Soviet Army|Soviet Armed Forces from 1984 to 1986.

Amirkhan Mori joined the workforce in 1978, first as an office worker at the Distributed Control System of the Retail Management Department of Tbilisi, and then as a technology specialist at the Research Institute for Stable Isotopes, also in Tbilisi, Georgia.

He joined forces with his brother to establish one of the first self-supporting for-profit companies in the Soviet Union in the late 1980s.

Amirkhan Mori has held executive positions at various for-profit organizations since 1992.

He has been one of the owners of PNTZ (a company based in Pervouralsk, Sverdlovsk Region) since 1998.

Amirkhan Mori has been on the Board of Directors of Orenburggeologia since 2000

He was Deputy CEO at Pervouralsk Trading House in 2004 - 2005

He has been Chairman of Regions OAO (parent company of the Regions Group) since 2008.

Professional and business accomplishments
Amirkhan Mori is one of the core owners of the Regions Group established in 2004 (alongside Alikhan and Amiran Mutsoevs and Alexander Karpov).

The Regions Group has a focus on retail real estate, owns a chain of Iyun (“June”) retail and entertainment centers and a chain of Sibirsky Gorodok (“Small Town in Siberia”) shopping malls in different cities across Russia. According to Russian media, the Group owned 27 operating retail and retail and entertainment facilities with a total area of 600,000 square meters at year-end 2013. Another four facilities are under construction, and construction of new Iyun retail and entertainment centers in Omsk, Saratov and Penza. According to the Russia TOP-100 list by INFOLine Developers, the Regions Group is the fourth largest real estate owner in Russia. In addition, the Regions Group is planning to invest approximately US$1 billion in construction of DreamWorks Animation theme parks in Russia. The Group intends to open three DreamWorks Animation parks in Moscow, St. Petersburg and Yekaterinburg. Amirkhan Mori describes this project as one of his priorities for the next several years.

Amirkhan Mori, alongside his partners by the Regions Group Alikhan and Amiran Mutsoev, regularly makes it to the Russian Forbes top 10 list of the richest real estate owners in Russia (both domestic and overseas-based).

In August 2013, Amirkhan Mori acquired an 18.5% equity stake in Polyus Gold, a major gold producer in Russia. Russian media estimates the value of the stake at US$1.83 billion.

References

1961 births
Living people
Moscow State University alumni
Businesspeople from Tbilisi
Businesspeople in real estate
Yazidis from Georgia (country)